Milton Atchison Reckord (December 28, 1879 – September 8, 1975) was a lieutenant general in the National Guard of the United States. He also served as Adjutant General of the State of Maryland.

Early life
Reckord was born to John and Lydia (Zimmerman) Reckord at their home in Harford County, Maryland. He commenced work at his father's milling plant in 1896 upon his graduation from Bel Air High School.

Military career
Reckord expressed desire to serve in the military, but, at the request of his mother, delayed entry into service until he turned 21.  He enlisted in Company D, 1st Maryland Infantry, Maryland National Guard on February 15, 1901, and would eventually rise to command the same company when he was commissioned as a captain in December 1904.  As a major, in 1916, Reckord was given command of the 2nd Battalion, 1st Maryland Infantry, which deployed to the Mexican border and served in the Mexican Expedition commanded by Gen. John J. Pershing.  When the 29th Infantry Division was created on the eve of World War I in 1917, Reckord was given command of one of its regiments, the 115th Infantry, which saw combat during the Meuse-Argonne Offensive.  In 1920, he was appointed Adjutant General of the Maryland National Guard and, in 1934, while still serving as Maryland's Adjutant General, he assumed command of the 29th Infantry Division.

During the years between the First and Second World War, Reckord was a leading advocate for increasing the role of the National Guard in the United States' national defensive strategy.  From 1923 to 1925, he served as president of the National Guard Association of the United States. In 1933, he authored legislation that permanently gave National Guard personnel status as both state and federal troops.  

Reckord was mobilized for World War II with the 29th Infantry Division in February 1941 and took a leave of absence from his post as Maryland's Adjutant General.  Deemed by the Army to be too old to command a division in combat, he was relieved of command and assigned as the commander of the III Corps Area.  He later deployed overseas and was named Theater Provost Marshal, European Theater of Operations.

After World War II, Reckord returned to his post as the Adjutant General of Maryland.  He received a state promotion to Lieutenant General from Governor J. Millard Tawes in 1961, and continued to serve as Adjutant General until his retirement in 1966.

Death and burial
Record died at Fort Howard Veterans Hospital in Fort Howard, Maryland, on September 8, 1975.  He was buried at Mountain Christian Church Cemetery in Joppa, Maryland.

Family
In 1910, Reckord married Bessie Payne Roe. They were the parents of a daughter, Gladys Atchison Reckord. Mrs. Reckord died on January 17, 1943, and Reckord never remarried. After retiring, he resided in Ruxton, Maryland, with his daughter and her husband, H. Frederick Jones Jr.

Memberships
In his military life, Reckord was a leader of the National Guard Association of the United States (NGAUS), and served as its president from 1923 to 1925. In the years after World War II, Reckord was chairman of the NGAUS Committee on Legislation, and was the first individual to be appointed a life member of the NGAUS Executive Council. He was also a member of the Adjutants General Association of the United States (AGAUS), the 29th Infantry Division Association, the Veterans of Foreign Wars, the Military Order of Foreign Wars, and the Army and Navy Club.

In his civilian life, Reckord was a member of the National Rifle Association (NRA) beginning in 1920, and served on the organization's Executive Council and as its executive vice president. He served as president of both the Maryland Jockey Club, which owned Pimlico Race Course, and the Hartford Agricultural and Breeders Association, which owned Havre de Grace Racetrack. In addition, he belonged to the Freemasons, Maryland Club, Baltimore Country Club, Advertising Club of Baltimore, and Racquet Club of Washington, D.C.

Legacy
The Reckord Trophy is a prize awarded annually to the Army National Guard battalion(s) that achieves the highest standards of training and readiness. 
The Reckord Trophy is one of the highest peacetime awards given to National Guard units.
The Reckord Armory at the University of Maryland is named after General Reckord.

Honors
Reckord was the recipient of several honorary degrees, including: Franklin & Marshall College (LL.D., 1943); Western Maryland College (Doctor of Military Science and Tactics, 1943); the University of Maryland (LL.D., 1944); and Pennsylvania Military College (LL.D., 1944).

Reckord Armory, a recreation and athletics building on the campus of the University of Maryland, College Park, was named for Reckord in 1961.

There is also a National Guard facility in the town of Bel Air, Maryland known as Reckord Armory. No longer used for military activities, it is now a facility for public events including weddings, trade shows, and business meetings.

In 1950, Reckord was the first recipient of the National Guard Association of the United States Distinguished Service Medal. Also in 1950, Reckord received the American Legion's Distinguished Service Medal.

Awards and medals

Reckford's decorations include the following:

See also

A History of the Adjutants General of Maryland

References

Biographical information about Milton Reckord at UMD Archives

Further reading
The Maryland National Guard: A History of Maryland's Military Forces 1634–1991, by Joseph M. Balkoski

1879 births
1975 deaths
United States Army generals
National Guard (United States) generals
United States Army personnel of World War I
United States Army generals of World War II
People from Harford County, Maryland
Recipients of the Distinguished Service Medal (US Army)
Military personnel from Maryland